Cellana strigilis oliveri is a subspecies of large limpet, a marine gastropod mollusc in the family Patellidae, one of the families of true limpets.

References

 Powell A. W. B., William Collins Publishers Ltd, Auckland 1979 

Nacellidae
Gastropods of New Zealand